In Islam, a khatib, khateeb or khatib ( khaṭīb) is a person who delivers the sermon (khuṭbah) (literally "narration"), during the Friday prayer and Eid prayers.

The khateeb is usually the prayer leader (imam), but the two roles can be played by different people. The khatib should be knowledgeable of how to lead the prayer and be competent in delivering the speech (khutba) however there are no requirements of eligibility to become a khatib beyond being an Adult Muslim. Some Muslims believe the khatib has to be male but women do lead Friday prayers in number of places.

Women may be khateebahs. Edina Lekovic gave the inaugural khutba at the Women's Mosque in 2015.

See also

 Al-Khatib
 Khattab
 Khutba
 İmam Hatip school
 Khatib - a MRT train station in Singapore
 Khatib - a village in Saudi Arabia

References

Islamic terminology